Clara Zully Montero (born January 25, 1944) is a Cuban actress who has worked in television, film, and theatre.

Biography
Montero was born in Santo Suarez, Cuba.  At the age of 11, Montero gathered a group of friends and created her own plays, which were presented to family and friends.  Her mother noticed her interest in performing, and placed her in La Academia De Arte Dramatico De La Habana (School of Dramatic Arts in Havana, Cuba).  When she graduated from school, she participated in a radio talent contest, which was searching for an actress to participate in a radio soap opera. She won the contest and was featured on the show.  After the radio soap opera, she went on to do some theater.  At the age of 16, she placed her acting career on hold to get married, and gave birth to two daughters, Martha and Elaine. Her life in Cuba was very difficult, and the lack of liberty led to her decision to leave Cuba.

Montero and her husband moved to her uncle-in-law's home in New York, United States, and they worked to provide food and shelter for their family.  She worked in a shoe factory, a post card factory, and in clothing factories.  During this time, she became pregnant with her third child, Jezabel Montero.  Then she decided to study English and take typing classes.  She got a job in an import/export company near Wall Street in New York City. There, she bumped into an old friend with whom she had done theater in Cuba.  He invited her to his theater group, where she began acting again.  Her husband did not approve her acting, and this led to their divorce.  She had to work two jobs to maintain her family, but continued working in the theater.  There, she began expanding her acting career from theater to television.  In 1979, she played Aurelia in the movie "El Super". Then in 1990, she appeared in her first on-screen soap opera, "El Magnate".

Filmography

El Super (1979) .... Aurelia
El magnate (1990, TV Series) .... Antonia
Corte Tropical (1990, TV Series) .... Gloria
Cape Fear (1991) .... Graciella
Marielena (1992, TV Series) .... Claudia Sandoval
Guadalupe (1993, TV Series) .... Luisa Zambrano de Maldonado / Marquesa de Covadonga
Señora Tentacion (1995, TV Series) .... Marlene
Aguamarina (1997, TV Series) .... Doña Augusta  Calatrava
Maria Celina (1998, TV Series) .... Isaura Quintero
Cosas Del Amor (1998, TV Series) .... Mercedes Castro-Iglesias V. de Maticorena
Me Muero Por Ti (1999, TV Series) .... Margot Hidalgo
Estrellita (2000, TV Series) .... Ruth Johnson
A 2.50 La Cuba Libre (2001) .... Doris La Caimana
Vale Todo (2002, TV Series) .... Lucrecia Roitman-Villain
El Dulce Pajaro De La Juventud (2003) .... La Princesa Kosmonopolis
El Huevo Del Gallo (2003) .... Elsa
A Cuban Christmas Carol (2003) .... Ghost Of Christmas Past
Prisionera (2004, TV Series) .... Rosalia Riobueno Viuda De Moncada
Alborada (2005, TV Series) .... Adelaida De Guzman
Los Proceres (2005) .... Amelia Cisneros
La Virgen De Coromoto (2006) .... Maria Consuelo
Full Grown Men (2006) .... Teya
El Hombre Que Vino Del Mar (2006) .... Claudia
La viuda de Blanco (2006, TV Series) .... Perfecta Albarracin Viuda De Blanco
O.K. (2007) .... Milly
Amor Comprado (2007, TV Series) .... Gertrudis De La Fuente-Villain
El Rostro de Analía (2008, TV Series) .... Carmen Rodriguez De Andrade-Main villain
Perro amor (2010, TV Series) .... Cecilia Brando
El fantasma de Elena (2010, TV Series) .... Margot Uzcátegui, Ruth Marchan (La Reina)
Aurora (2011, TV Series) .... Catalina Quintana
Toc/Toc (2012) .... Maria
Rosario (2012-2013, TV Series) .... Regina Montalban
Santa Diabla (2013, TV Series) .... Hortencia de Santana
Cassanova Was a Woman (2016)
Death of a Fool (2020) .... Irene

External links
 Cara a Cara Zully reveló grandes secretos 
 
www.allmovie.com : Zully Montero

References

Cuban film actresses
Cuban telenovela actresses
Living people
1944 births
20th-century Cuban actresses
21st-century Cuban actresses